Samothrace (also known as Samothraki;) is a Greek island in the northern Aegean Sea. It is a municipality within the Evros regional unit of Thrace. Its main industries are fishing and tourism. Resources on the island include granite and basalt. The Winged Victory of Samothrace, which is now displayed at the Louvre in Paris, originates from the island.

History

Antiquity

It was, however, the home of the Sanctuary of the Great Gods, site of important Hellenic and pre-Hellenic religious ceremonies. Among those who visited this shrine to be initiated into the island cult were Lysander of Sparta, Philip II of Macedon and Lucius Calpurnius Piso Caesoninus, father-in-law of Julius Caesar.

The ancient city, the ruins of which are called Palaeopolis ("old city"), was situated on the north coast. Considerable remains still exist of the ancient walls, which were built in massive Cyclopean style, as well as of the Sanctuary of the Great Gods, where mysterious rites (Samothracian Mysteries) took place which were open to both slaves and free people (similar to the Eleusinian Mysteries). Demetrios of Skepsis mentions the Samothracian Mysteries; as does Aristophanes in his Peace.

The traditional account from antiquity is that Samothrace was first inhabited by Pelasgians and Carians, and later Thracians. At the end of the 8th century BC the island was colonised by Greeks from Samos, from which the name Samos of Thrace, that later became Samothrace; however, Strabo denies this. The archaeological evidence suggests that Greek settlement was in the sixth century BC.

The Persians occupied Samothrace in 508 BC, it later passed under Athenian control, and was a member of the Delian League in the 5th century BC. It was subjugated by Philip II, and from then till 168 BC it was under Macedonian suzerainty. With the battle of Pydna Samothrace became independent, a condition that ended when Vespasian absorbed the island in the Roman Empire in AD 70.

During the Roman and particularly the imperial period, thanks to the interest of the Roman emperors, the radiation of the sanctuary of the Great Gods surpassed Greek borders and Samothrace became an international religious center, where pilgrims flocked from all over the Roman world. Apart from the famous sanctuary, also playing a decisive role in the great development of Samothrace were her two ports, situated on the sea road Troas – Macedonia. Furthermore, an important role was played by her possessions in Perea, which were conceded by the Romans at least during the imperial period, as evidenced by inscriptions of the 1st AD century.

The Book of Acts in the Christian Bible records that the Apostle Paul, on his second missionary journey outside of Palestine, sailed from Troas to Samothrace and spent one night there on his way to Macedonia. The island is mentioned in the King James Version of the Bible, with the name Samothracia.

Middle Ages to Modern era

St. Theophanes died in Samothrace in 818. The Byzantines ruled until 1204, when Venetians took their place, only to be dislodged by a Genoese family in 1355, the Gattilusi. The Ottoman Empire conquered it in 1457 and it was called  in Turkish. In the era of Kanuni Sultan Süleyman the Island became a vakıf for the Süleymaniye Mosque and its Imaret in İstanbul. During the Ottoman period, it was one of the islands open to settlement among the Boğazönü Islands. The appearance of a person coming from Samothrace among the new inhabitants of the island of Lemnos in 1490 indicates that the population movements on the island were mostly with the surrounding islands and therefore the coastal areas close to Anatolia. The total tax population of the island in 1519 was 182 soldiers (male population of fighting age). 53 of them were newcomers to the island. There was a total tax population of 220 soldiers here in 1530 (twelve of whom were foreigners). In 1569, there were a total of 4 settlements and a tax population of 742 soldiers on the island. 7 soldiers of this population were Muslims. The fact that neighborhoods, which are the main features of Ottoman towns and cities, were established in this last date indicates the process of becoming a town. However, in the mid-17th century, Bernard Randolph, while describing the island with Thasos and Imbros, states that all three of the Islands were neglected because they were flooded by pirates, and there were only two or three villages in each of them. According to Charles Vellay a rebellion against the Ottoman Rule and Muslim Population by the local population during the Greek War of Independence (1821–1831) led to the massacre of 1,000 inhabitants. The island came under Greek rule in 1913 following the Balkan Wars. It was occupied temporarily by Bulgaria during the Second World War, from 1941 to 1944.

Today
The modern port town of Kamariotissa is on the north-west coast and provides ferry access to and from points in northern Greece such as Alexandroupoli and Kavala. There is no commercial airport on the island. Other sites of interest on the island include the ruins of Genoese forts, the picturesque Chora (literally village) and Paleapolis (literally Old Town), and several waterfalls.

A 2019 article estimated that the current population of goats on the island outnumbers humans by about 15 to 1, resulting in unwanted erosion as a result of overgrazing.

Landmarks
The island's most famous site is the Sanctuary of the Great Gods (Greek: Hieron ton Megalon Theon). The most famous artifact from the temple complex is the 2.5-metre marble statue of Nike (now known as the Winged Victory of Samothrace), which dates from about 190 BC. It was discovered in pieces on the island in 1863 by the French archaeologist Charles Champoiseau. It is now headless and is displayed at the Louvre in Paris. The Winged Victory is featured on the island's municipal seal.

Communities

Alonia	(pop. 291 in 2011)
Ano Karyotes (22)
Ano Meria (57)
Dafnes (16)
Kamariotissa (1,069)
Kato Karyotes (41)
Katsampas (15)
Lakkoma (317)
Makrylies (12)
Palaiopoli (36)
Potamia (6)
Profitis Ilias (189)
Samothrace/Samothraki (Chora) (653)
Therma (106)
Xiropotamos (29)

Province
The province of Samothrace was one of the provinces of the Evros Prefecture. It had the same territory as the present municipality. It was abolished in 2006.

Climate
Samothraki has a hot-summer Mediterranean climate. Winters are cool and rainy with occasional heavy snowstorms, especially at higher elevations.

Historical population

People
Aristarchus of Samothrace, ancient Greek grammarian and Homeric scholar
Theophanes the Confessor
Nikolaos Fardys (1853–1901), Greek scholar

Gallery

See also
List of settlements in the Evros regional unit
Samothrace temple complex
Winged Victory of Samothrace
Battle of Samothrace (1698)

References

Michel Mourre, Dictionnaire Encyclopédique d'Histoire, article "Samothrace", Bordas, 1996
Marcel Dunan, Histoire Universelle, Larousse, 1960

External links

Official Samothrace webpage (in Greek)
Samothraki Visitor Information Website (in English)

 
Islands of Greece
Municipalities of Eastern Macedonia and Thrace
Provinces of Greece
Landforms of Evros (regional unit)
Islands of Eastern Macedonia and Thrace
Populated places in Evros (regional unit)
North Aegean islands
Mediterranean port cities and towns in Greece
Ionian colonies in Thrace
Samian colonies
Members of the Delian League
Thracian Sea
Territories of the Republic of Venice
Territories of the Republic of Genoa
Hellenic Navy bases
Populated places in the ancient Aegean islands